Graczyk is a Polish surname, it may refer to:
 Ed Graczyk (born 1941/1942), American playwright
 Jean Graczyk (1933–2004), French professional bicycle racer 
 Jim Graczyk (born 1969), American researcher and author on the subject of ghosts
 Kristen Graczyk (born 1983), American former soccer forward and defender
 Michael Graczyk (born 1950), American journalist

Polish-language surnames